The 2009 UEFA Women's Under-17 Championship was the second edition of the UEFA Women's Under-17 Championship. Germany won the trophy for the second time in a row.

Qualification
There were two qualifying rounds, and four teams qualified for the final round, played in Switzerland.

First qualifying round
The ten group winners and best six runners-up advanced to the second qualifying round. The host nations of the ten one-venue mini-tournament groups are indicated in the tables.

Group 1

Group 2

Group 3

Group 4

Group 5

Group 6

Group 7

Group 8

Group 9

Group 10

Ranking of second-placed teams
To determine the best six runner-up teams from the first qualifying round, only the results against the first and the third teams in each group were taken into account.

Second qualifying round
The sixteen qualified teams from the first qualifying round were allocated in four groups of four teams each. The group winners advanced to the final tournament. The host nations of the four one-venue mini-tournament groups are indicated in italics.

Group 1

Group 2

Group 3

Group 4

Final tournament

The knockout stage was played in Switzerland.

Final

External links
RSSSF.com – results

UEFA Women's Under-17 Championship
Uefa under-17 women's championship
Uefa under-17 women's championship
International women's association football competitions hosted by Switzerland
UEFA
2009 in youth sport
June 2009 sports events in Europe
2009 in youth association football